The Samsung Galaxy Fit is an activity tracker designed, developed, and marketed by Samsung Electronics. It was released on 20 February 2019, along with the lower-priced Galaxy Fit e. It was made available for sale on June 14, 2019.

Specifications

Hardware

It features a  120x240 AMOLED touchscreen display, with 32MB of internal storage and 2MB of RAM. It contains a 120mAh battery, and has an accelerometer, gyroscope, and heartrate sensor. It is also rated waterproof up to 5ATM. The watch can be charged wirelessly through near-field communication.

Software
The Galaxy Fit pairs through Bluetooth 5.0 and Bluetooth 5.1 (Galaxy Fit 2) with a smartphone running an OS newer than Android 5.0 or iOS 10.0. The pairing requires the installation of three applications and one plugin, which include the Galaxy Fit plugin, the Samsung Wearables app, Samsung Health, and Samsung Accessory Service. The watch runs on FreeRTOS. It has various widgets for fitness, stress, and heartbeat tracking, although it did not have GPS connected with the phone when launched, a software update added this feature.

Reception 
The smartwatch received mixed to positive reviews from critics. PC Magazine gave it a 4/5 excellent score, praising the cost, accurate health tracking, and battery, while criticizing the need for two applications and the large bezel. Reviewers from TechRadar gave the watch a score of 3/5, positively describing the battery life and display, while critiquing the lack of GPS and the quality of the distance tracking. Digital Trends and Android Authority praised the display, water resistance, battery, and weight, but criticised the lack of GPS and the setup procedures.

References

Samsung Galaxy
Activity trackers